Pungro is a settlement in Kiphire district of Nagaland state of India.

Population 
According to the 2011 Census of India, there were two parts of Pungro. Pungro Hq had a population of 4,744, while Pungro Village had a population of 972 people.

References

Villages in Kiphire district